, prov. designation: , is a highly eccentric planet crossing trans-Neptunian object, also classified as centaur and damocloid, approximately  in diameter. It is on a retrograde cometary orbit. It has a barycentric semi-major axis (average distance from the Sun) of approximately 286 AU.

Discovery 

This trans-Neptunian object was discovered on 1 July 2010, by NASA's space-based Wide-field Infrared Survey Explorer (WISE). It was first observed by the Mount Lemmon Survey in 2009, extending the body's observation arc by 8 months prior to its official discovery observation by WISE.

Orbit and classification 

 orbits the Sun at a distance of 9.4–547.2 AU once every 4643 years and 5 months (1,696,004 days; semi-major axis of 278.33 AU). Its orbit has an eccentricity of 0.97 and an inclination of 141° with respect to the ecliptic. It came to perihelion in December 2010 at a distance of 9.4 AU from the Sun. , it is 21.3 AU from the Sun. It will not be 50 AU from the Sun until late 2044. After leaving the planetary region of the Solar System,  will have a barycentric aphelion of 563 AU with an orbital period of 4830 years. In a 10 million year integration of the orbit, the nominal (best-fit) orbit and both 3-sigma clones remain outside 7.7AU (qmin) from the Sun.

Numbering and naming 

This minor planet was numbered by the Minor Planet Center on 31 August 2012. , it has not been named.

Physical characteristics 

According to the surveys carried out by the NEOWISE mission,  measures 44.2 kilometers in diameter and its surface has a low albedo of 0.057.

Notes

References

External links 
 MPEC 2010-N54 : 2010 NV1, IAU Minor Planet Electronic Circular
 

Trans-Neptunian objects
Centaurs (small Solar System bodies)
Damocloids
Discoveries by WISE
20100701
Minor planets with a retrograde orbit